Roberto De Patre (born 13 September 1988) is an Italian former professional racing cyclist, who rode professionally for  and  between 2010 and 2014.

References

External links

1988 births
Living people
Italian male cyclists
Cyclists from Abruzzo
Sportspeople from the Province of Teramo